Dockery Lake may refer to:

Dockery Lake Recreation Area, in Georgia
Dockery Lake (Michigan), a lake in Michigan